Thanjavur Damayanthi Kusalakumari (6 December 1937 - 7 March 2019) was an Indian actress and dancer. She featured in Tamil, Telugu and Malayalam language films.

Early life 
Born in Thanjavur, Kusalakumari is a niece of T. R. Rajakumari. Her birth name is Kusalambal. Being born in an artistes family, she began learning Bharata Natyam at the age of 3. When she was 5 years old, the family moved to Chennai. She used to go to film shooting with her aunt T. R. Rajakumari.

Film career 
Kusalakumari began her film career as a child artiste. Though she has danced in films before, she got a character role in Avvaiyar as the child Avvaiyar. Her major role as the poor woman falling in love with Sivaji Ganesan, was in Koondukili, the only film Sivaji Ganesan and M. G. Ramachandran featured together. Later she acted as the younger sister of Sivaji Ganesan in Kalvanin Kadhali, and then as the younger sister of K. R. Ramasamy in Needhipathi.

The competition dance with Kumari Kamala in Konjum Salangai brought fame to her as a dancer.

She began her film career in Telugu with Raju Peda as a dancer. The film featured N. T. Rama Rao in the main role and was a success. After that, she starred in many Telugu films both as dancer and in character roles.

She was paired with Prem Nazir in Malayalam-language film Seeta in the title role. The film ran for more than 200 days. Another Malayalam film Mariakutty won the President's award.

Awards 
 Kalaimamani
 Kalai Chelvam

Later life 
Kusalakumari did not marry. She lived with her brother T. D. Sekar in Chennai. The then Chief minister of Tamil Nadu J. Jayalalitha learned of Kusalakumari's financial difficulties and sanctioned a monthly allowance of Rs.5000.

Death 
Kusalakumari died of old age (83) on 7 March 2019 in Chennai.

Filmography

References 

1937 births
2019 deaths
Actresses in Tamil cinema
Actresses in Malayalam cinema
20th-century Indian actresses
Actresses in Telugu cinema
Indian film actresses